The 2014 All-Ireland Under-21 Hurling Championship was the 51st staging of the All-Ireland hurling championship for players under the age of twenty-one since its establishment by the Gaelic Athletic Association in 1964. The championship began on 28 May 2014 and ended on 13 September 2014.

Clare were the defending champions and successfully retained their title and winning three-in-a-row after beating Wexford by 2-20 to 3-11 in the final.

Results

Leinster Under-21 Hurling Championship

Munster Under-21 Hurling Championship

Ulster Under-21 Hurling Championship

All-Ireland Under-21 Hurling Championship

Championship statistics

Scoring

 First goal of the championship: Colm Cronin for Dublin against Laois (28 May 2014)
Widest winning margin: 30
Antrim 7-17 - 1-05 Down (23 July 2014)
Most goals in a match: 8
Antrim 7-17 - 1-05 Down (23 July 2014)
Most points in a match: 44
Clare 5-19 - 1-25 Tipperary (16 July 2014)
Most goals by one team in a match: 7
Antrom 7-17 - 1-05 Down (23 July 2014)
 Highest aggregate score: 62
Clare 5-19 - 1-25 Tipperary (16 July 2014)
Lowest aggregate score: 27
Westmeath 0-13 - 2-8 Dublin (25 June 2014)
Most goals scored by a losing team: 3
Armagh 3-7 - 3-24 Down (16 July 2014)

Discipline

 First red card of the championship: Willie Young for Laois against Dublin (28 May 2014)

Scoring statistics

Championship

Single game

External links
 2014 Leinster Under-21 Hurling Championship
 2014 Munster Under-21 Hurling Championship

References

Under-21
All-Ireland Under-21 Hurling Championship